A list of films produced by the Israeli film industry in 1964.

1964 releases

See also
1964 in Israel

References

External links
 Israeli films of 1964 at the Internet Movie Database

Israeli
Film
1964